Mares are adult female horses or other equines.

Mares may also refer to:
 Mares (surname) (including a list of persons with the name)
 Mareš, a Czech surname (including a list of persons with the name)
 Saint Mari, also known as Mares, a 1st-century Christian saint
 Mares (scuba equipment), manufacturer of scuba equipment
 Mares (tribe), an ancient Colchian tribe
 Muscle Atrophy Research and Exercise System (MARES), a facility on the International Space Station

See also 
 Mare (disambiguation)
 Maris (disambiguation)